Richard Bligh (1780-1838), chancery barrister, son of John Bligh and a cousin of Admiral William Bligh, was educated at Westminster School and Trinity College, Cambridge. He graduated B.A. in 1803 and M.A. in 1806. He was called to the bar by the Society of the Inner Temple on 1 May 1807 and was admitted to the Society of Lincoln's Inn on 17 November 1826. He became an equity draftsman at the chancery bar. He was a hard worker, and had a fair amount of practice in his profession; but a considerable amount of his time was taken up by reporting in the House of Lords, in which business he was engaged for several years.

Works
His works, in the order of their publication, are:
A Report of the Case of Bills of Exchange made payable at Bankers, as decided in the House of Lords. London. 1821.
Reports of Cases heard in the House of Lords on Appeals and Writs of Error. 10 vols. 1823.
A Digest of the Bankrupt Law. 1832.
Bellum Agrarium; a Foreview of the Winter of 1835, suggested by the Poor Law Project, with observations on the Report and the Bill. 1834.
Reports of Cases in Bankruptcy. 1835. Bligh was aided in this work by Basil Montagu.

References

Venn and Venn (eds). "Bligh, Richard". Alumni Cantabrigienses. Volume 2: From 1752 to 1900. Part 1. Cambridge University Press. 1940. Reprinted 2011. Page 298.
Frederic H Forshall. "Richard Bligh". Westminster School: Past and Present. Wyman & Sons. Great Queen Street, London. 1884. Pages 292 and 293.
Joseph Welch. "R Bligh". The List of the Queen's Scholars of St. Peter's College, Westminster. G W Ginger. London. 1852. Page 452. See also page 451.
Thompson Cooper. "Bligh, Richard". A Biographical Dictionary. George Bell & Sons. York Street, Covent Garden, London. 1890. Volume 1. Page 238. A New Biographical Dictionary. Macmillan and Co. New York. 1874. Page 238.
Marvin. Legal Bibliography. 1847. Page 130.
Survey of London. Volume 24. Page 81.

1780 births
1838 deaths
English barristers
Members of the Inner Temple
Members of Lincoln's Inn
People educated at Westminster School, London
Alumni of Trinity College, Cambridge
19th-century English lawyers